The Eighth National Games of the People’s Republic of China was held in Shanghai from October 12 to 24, 1997. The participating delegations included 46 delegations from all provinces, autonomous regions, municipalities directly under the Central Government, the People’s Liberation Army, and 13 trade associations. It was the first time that the SAR Hong Kong and the Chongqing Municipality have organized a team to participate in the National Games.

Events 

There were 28 major events in the competition, with a total of 319 minor events

  Diving
  Swimming
  Synchronized swimming
  Water polo
 
 
 
 
 
 
 

 

 
 

 Artistic gymnastics 
 Rhythmic gymnastics 
 
 
 

 
 
 Sailing
 Windsurfing
 

 Short speed skating
 Long speed skating

Medal table

References 

October 1997 events
1997 in multi-sport events
1997 in China
National Games of China